Wolf's Head may refer to:
 Wolf's Head (secret society), founded at Yale University in 1883
 Wolf's Head (Wind River) is a peak in Wyoming's Cirque of the Towers
 Wolf's Head (motor oil), company founded in 1879

See also
 Caput lupinum, meaning "wolf's head" in Latin
 Wolf
 Wolfshead: The Legend of Robin Hood
 Wolfshead